Scaevola thesioides  is a species of flowering plant in the family Goodeniaceae and is endemic to the southwest of Western Australia. It is a spreading subshrub to perennial herb with thread-like to lance-shaped leaves and hairy, fan-shaped, pale blue to white flowers.

Description

Taxonomy
Scaevola thesioides was first formally described in 1837 by George Bentham and the description was published in Enumeratio plantarum quas in Novae Hollandiae ora austro-occidentali ad fluvium Cygnorum et in Sinu Regis Georgii collegit Carolus liber baro de Hügel. The specific epithet (thesioides) means Thesium-like.

Distribution and habitat
This scaevola grows in near-coastal areas of south-western Western Australia in the Coolgardie, Esperance Plains, Geraldton Sandplains, Mallee and Swan Coastal Plain bioregions.

References

 

thesioides
Flora of Western Australia
Plants described in 1837
Taxa named by George Bentham